Little Mangere is a small island of the Chatham Archipelago, just off the western end of Mangere Island, about 4 km (2½ mi) west of Pitt Island and  south-east of the town of Waitangi on Chatham Island. The island is called Tapuaenuku in Moriori and Māori, and was formerly called The Fort.

Little Mangere is privately owned and was once the last refuge of the few remaining Black robin until they were transferred to nearby  Mangere Island and South East Island as part of a species recovery plan in the early 1980s. The island still hosts the largest sooty shearwater (Puffinus griseus) colony in the Chathams group.

See also

 Desert island
 List of islands

References

Islands of the Chatham Islands
Uninhabited islands of New Zealand